, also called  in Japan, is a sub-category of doujin activity. Doujin are non-official self-published Japanese works which can be based on official products or completely original creations. Such products are sold online on specialized sites, on the authors' own sites, and in conventions such as the popular Comiket.

Genres and production
Doujin music isn't a musical genre in itself, but is indicative of a particular means of publication much in the same way as the term "indie" is used.

Often, such music will consist of video game music fan arrangements. Much original doujin music also exists, and has been created both for doujin games and independently, spanning many musical genres such as pop, rock, techno, trance, hardcore and many more.

By nature, doujin music is self-produced at low cost by independent artists. Home-studio software is typically advantageous to doujin music composers, as it is cheaper than studio-mastering live instruments. As such, most doujin music has a distinct synthetic quality to it. It is common to have one live instrument (such as a guitar) backed up by synthetic orchestrations, though full instrumentation is becoming more and more common in doujin music, such as orchestral works or doujin jazz.

Organization
Doujin music artists can be solo or band projects. It is very common for members of different groups to collaborate on an album. Some projects, such as Woodsoft, are collaborations of several artists contributing to a given theme for each of their album releases.

Each member of a group usually has their own individual site on which they release their personal works, free to download, and possibly give updates about their involvement in upcoming albums. Some artists actually never release albums and contain the scope of their artistic activity to free releases. The most productive groups usually release two albums a year, released in the summer and winter Comiket conventions and sold for an average of 1000 yen for full-length albums. The most involved and popular artists are usually featured on their own group albums but also make guest appearance on other groups' CDs.

Aside from Comiket, events held in Japan for doujin music include the bi-annual M3 music summit and the Hakurei Shrine Reitaisai, the latter of which includes music derived from Touhou Project.

Notable artists and groups

Akiko Shikata, a soprano singer, composer, arranger, producer and multi-instrumentalist whose songs often tend towards experimentalism
Annabel, who has worked on several anime productions and is known for works in partnership with musicians like Nagi Yanagi and bermei.inazawa
Chata, a video game and anime vocalist
Haruka Shimotsuki, a vocalist known for her fantasy themes
IOSYS, a doujin group most commonly recognized for their Touhou arrangements
Kishida Kyōdan & The Akeboshi Rockets, a rock band formed by Kishida and four other members
Rekka Katakiri, a singer who manages her own Closed/Underground label
Sound Horizon, who describe themselves as a "fantasy band"
Team Shanghai Alice, the creator of and the composer for the Touhou Project

Doujin lyrics
Sometimes, people may rewrite the lyrics of an existing anime song to create a doujin song, or insert lyrics into an originally instrumental anime track. These type of doujin songs are called . Many doujin lyrics are written in Japanese, Chinese, or Korean.

Moreover, there are fan dubs of different languages of ACG songs, video game music, or Vocaloid songs, all in many different languages including English, Spanish, and others.

See also
Doujin soft
Doujinshi
Denpa song
Vocaloid
Video game music
Self publishing
Independent music

References

 
Indie music
Cassette culture 1970s–1990s